Jakub Szymański may refer to:

Jakub Szymański (volleyball) (born 1998), Polish volleyball player
Jakub Szymański (athlete) (born 2002), Polish hurdler
Jakub Szymański (footballer) (born 2002), Polish association football player